Te Kura Kaupapa Māori o Nga Taonga Tuturu ki Tokomaru is a Kura Kaupapa Māori primary school located in Tokomaru Bay, New Zealand.

Primary schools in New Zealand
Schools in the Gisborne District
Kura Kaupapa Māori schools